Manuel Gerolin (born 9 February 1961 in Mestre) is an Italian former professional footballer who played as a midfielder.

Honours
Roma
 Coppa Italia: 1985–86, 1990–91

External links
Manuel Gerolin – Player profile

1961 births
Living people
Italian footballers
Association football midfielders
Serie A players
Serie B players
Udinese Calcio players
A.S. Roma players
Bologna F.C. 1909 players